Kim Myoung-jun (born May 13, 1994) is a South Korean professional footballer who plays as a centre-back for Gyeongnam.

Club career 
Kim made his debut for Busan IPark on 25 April 2015 in a 1-1 draw with Ulsan. His first professional goal came on 19 August in a 4-2 defeat to Seoul. 
In February 2018, he changed his name from Kim Jong-hyuk to Kim Myoung-joon.

Club career statistics

References

External links 

Living people
South Korean footballers
Association football midfielders
K League 1 players
K League 2 players
Busan IPark players
Gyeongnam FC players
1994 births
Sportspeople from Busan